The JRA Award for Best Older Filly or Mare is a title awarded annually by the Japan Racing Association (JRA).
Since 1987 the honor has been part of the JRA Awards.

Records
Most successful horse (2 wins):
 Dyna Actress – 1987, 1988
 Mejiro Dober – 1998, 1999
 Vodka – 2008, 2009
 Buena Vista – 2010, 2011
 Gentildonna – 2013, 2014
 Lys Gracieux – 2018, 2019

Winners

References

Horse racing in Japan: JRA Awards

Horse racing awards
Horse racing in Japan